Antonio "Booman" Williams (born January 12, 1997) is an American professional basketball player for KR of the Úrvalsdeild karla. Prior to his professional career, he played college basketball for Indian Hills Community College and Kent State.

Early life and high school career
Williams grew up in K-Town, Chicago. At the age of 6 or 7, he began playing football, followed by soccer and basketball shortly afterward. In middle school, Williams scored 30 points in his first AAU game. By the time he enrolled in his freshman year at Farragut Career Academy, Williams decided to focus on basketball instead of football. He transferred to Proviso East High School before his sophomore season, playing under Donnie Boyce. Williams missed 20 games during his junior season due to academic ineligibility. As a senior, he averaged 24 points and six rebounds per game, earning Third Team All-State honors. Partially due to his academic issues, Williams received no Division I scholarship offers, so he decided to attend Indian Hills Community College.

College career
As a freshman, Williams averaged 9.3 points and 1.7 steals per game on a team that finished 29-5. During his sophomore season, Williams averaged 14.7 points and 4.8 rebounds per game and earned All-Region first team honors. He helped lead Indian Hills to a 33-1 record. Williams committed to Kent State due to its relatively close distance to his home in Chicago. 

As a junior, he averaged 11.5 points and 4.0 rebounds per game. On February 21, 2020, Williams posted a career-high 34 points in a 104-98 double overtime loss to Buffalo. He followed up that performance by scoring a game-high 17 points to lead Kent State past Miami (Ohio) 74-61. As a senior, Williams averaged 14.7 points, 3.8 assists, and 3.9 rebounds per game. He was named to the Second Team All-MAC as well as the MAC Defensive Team.

Professional career
On August 8, 2020, Williams signed with Vevey Riviera of the Swiss Basketball League. He never played for them because the club had big financial and administrative problems. In 2021 he signed with BC Tallinna Kalev in Estonia. In July 2021, Williams joined the Ottawa Blackjacks of the Canadian Elite Basketball League. On December 16, 2021, he signed with the Plymouth City Patriots of the British Basketball League.

On January 6, 2023, Williams signed with KR of the Úrvalsdeild karla.

Personal life
Williams is the son of Tamara Willis. His father was shot after entering a convenience store when Williams was 15. He received his nickname, Booman, from his aunt. Williams has a son, Ayden, born in 2015, with former girlfriend Sariah Vance.

References

External links
Kent State Golden Flashes bio
Twitter

1997 births
Living people
American men's basketball players
American expatriate basketball people in Canada
American expatriate basketball people in Estonia
American expatriate basketball people in Iceland
Basketball players from Chicago
Farragut Career Academy alumni
Indian Hills Warriors basketball players
Kent State Golden Flashes men's basketball players
KR men's basketball players
Ottawa Blackjacks players
Plymouth City Patriots players
Point guards
Úrvalsdeild karla (basketball) players